78 (seventy-eight) is the natural number following 77 and followed by 79.

In mathematics
78 is:

the dimension of the exceptional Lie group E6 and several related objects.
a sphenic number, having 3 distinct prime factors.
an abundant number with an aliquot sum of 90.
a semiperfect number, as a multiple of a perfect number.
the 12th triangular number.
a palindromic number in bases 5 (3035), 7 (1417), 12 (6612), 25 (3325), and 38 (2238).
a Harshad number in bases 3, 4, 5, 6, 7, 13 and 14.
an Erdős–Woods number, since it is possible to find sequences of 78 consecutive integers such that each inner member shares a factor with either the first or the last member.

77 and 78 form a Ruth–Aaron pair.

In science
The atomic number of platinum.

In other fields

78 is also:
In reference to gramophone records, 78 refers those meant to be spun at 78 revolutions per minute. Compare: LP,  and 45 rpm. 33 + 45 = 78
A typical tarot deck containing the 21 trump cards, the Fool and the 56 suit cards make up 78 cards
The Rule of 78s is a method of yearly interest calculation
 The number used by Martin Truex Jr. and Furniture Row Racing to win the 2017 Monster Energy NASCAR Cup Series championship and 2016 Coca-Cola 600. The team and driver Regan Smith also won the 2011 Bojangles’ Southern 500 with 78. The number is now used by owner-driver B.J. McLeod for Live Fast Motorsports.

References 

Integers